Liam Carberry (born 24 February 1993) is an English rugby league footballer who plays for the Rochdale Hornets in the Betfred Championship.

Widnes
On 23 April 2014, Carberry signed a new deal that would keep him at the club for at least another year. The young hooker has yet to make a Super League appearance for Widnes after breaking his leg and damaging ankle ligaments during a pre-season friendly.

He played for Whitehaven.

References

1993 births
Living people
English rugby league players
Rochdale Hornets players
Rugby league hookers
Rugby league players from St Helens, Merseyside
South Wales Scorpions players
Swinton Lions players
Whitehaven R.L.F.C. players
Widnes Vikings players
Wigan Warriors players